The York Time Institute is a school in York, Pennsylvania providing instruction in the conservation, restoration, and repair of traditional and modern time-keeping devices. It was founded in 2008 by Daniel Nied, former Director of the School of Horology of the National Association of Watch and Clock Collectors. The school is housed in a 19th-century building that also housed two different watchmakers in its 150-year history.

Instruction 

As a school of horological instruction, the York Time Institute teaches advanced skills, conservation, fundamental skills (lathe work, milling, parts-making, shaping, forming, horological science, and metallurgy), restorative arts (plating, engraving, engine turning, casting, and antique techniques), and youth programs (horological toys, history of timekeeping, and the science of time). The school offers a 54-week program, weekend short courses, and evening lectures.

Accreditation 
The York Time Institute is licensed by the Pennsylvania Department of Education. It is seeking accreditation by the Accrediting Commission of Career Schools and Colleges of Technology (ACCSCT).

References 

Educational institutions established in 2008
York, Pennsylvania
Education in York County, Pennsylvania
Horological organizations
2008 establishments in Pennsylvania